On 22 January 2022, a bomb exploded on a crowded public transport minivan in Herat, Afghanistan. It killed at least 7 civilians and injured 9 others.

The bomb was attached to the vehicle's fuel tank. No group claimed responsibility for the attack, which the Taliban said they will investigate.

Three of the wounded were critically injured. The bus was located in a Shia-majority neighbourhood.

See also 
Terrorist incidents in Afghanistan in 2022

Notes

References

2022 murders in Afghanistan
Bus bombing
21st-century mass murder in Afghanistan
Afghanistan conflict (1978–present)
Bus bombings in Asia
Car and truck bombings in Afghanistan
Bus bombing
Bus bombing
Improvised explosive device bombings in 2022
January 2022 crimes in Asia
Mass murder in 2022
Terrorist incidents in Afghanistan in 2022